Mikołaj Wolski (1553–1630) of Półkozic coat of arms, Grand Court Marshal 1600-1616, Grand Crown Marshal 1616–1630, diplomat of the Polish–Lithuanian Commonwealth, starost of Krzepice and Olsztyn. He was famous for founding the first Polish Camaldolese Monastery - Hermitage of Silver Mountain in Bielany near Kraków.

1553 births
1630 deaths
People from Pidhaitsi
16th-century Polish nobility
Polish Roman Catholics
Secular senators of the Polish–Lithuanian Commonwealth
Polish patrons of the arts
17th-century Polish nobility